"Drug Addicts" is a song by American rapper Lil Pump from his second studio album Harverd Dropout. It was released on July 6, 2018, by Tha Lights Global and Warner Records as the second single for the album.

Background
The song is included in Lil Pump's second studio album, Harverd Dropout. The artwork was revealed on July 4, 2018, when Charlie Sheen tweeted the image on his Twitter account. It features himself and Pump wearing matching jumpsuits. In a promotional video showing a conversation between Pump and Sheen posted on Instagram, Pump asks, "What we doing right now?" and Sheen responds with "We're about to make history".

Music video
In May 2018, Lil Pump announced his desire to recruit Charlie Sheen in his next music video. On July 3, 2018, Sheen published an image of himself and Pump, asking him "what day did you want to break the internet", on Twitter. A 50-second snippet was posted by Pump to his Twitter account, urging his followers to retweet if they wanted him to release the video immediately. The snippet has since received over 600,000 views. Consisting of "a narcotic theme and trippy visuals", the music video was officially released on July 5, 2018, featuring Charlie Sheen. It was directed by Hannah Lux Davis. The music video was filmed in Pomona, California.

In the video, Pump and Sheen wheel through a drug cart in a psychedelic hospital ward where the patients smoke, drink and consume drugs alongside the nurses who ride with Pump in a golf cart before gathering in an empty pool for a party.

Personnel

Baby Winsch – production
CB Mix – mastering, mixing, recording
Daniel Ryan Winsch – composer
Darius Lassiter – composer
Dee Money – production
Gazzy Garcia – composer, performer, vocals

Charts

References

2018 songs
Lil Pump songs
2018 singles
Music videos directed by Hannah Lux Davis
Songs written by Lil Pump